("the maiden of the bridge") is a character that first appeared in Japanese Heian-period literature, represented as a woman who spends lonely nights waiting for her lover to visit, and later as a fierce “oni” or demon fueled by jealousy. She came to be associated most often with a bridge in Uji.

Biography
Very little is known about the origin of Hashihime. The most common interpretation is that she was a lonely wife pining for her husband / lover to return but due to his infidelity, she became jealous and turned into a demon.

Japanese literature
Hashihime first appears in a Kokinshu (ca. 905) poem, of which the author is unknown:
“Upon a narrow grass mat
laying down her robe only
tonight, again – 
she must be waiting for me,
Hashihime of Uji” 
Hashihime’s name also appears in Murasaki’s The Tale of Genji, as the title of a chapter. She is also mentioned several times in the waka poems throughout the work.

References

External links 
Hashihime - The Bridge Princess at hyakumonogatari.com (English).
The Tale of the Hashihime of Uji at hyakumonogatari.com (English).
Oni
Female legendary creatures 
Japanese_legendary_creatures